The 1975 UCI Track Cycling World Championships were the World Championship for track cycling. They took place in Rocourt, Belgium in 1975. Eleven events were contested, 9 for men (3 for professionals, 6 for amateurs) and 2 for women.

Medal summary

Medal table

See also
 1975 UCI Road World Championships

References

Track cycling
UCI Track Cycling World Championships by year
International cycle races hosted by Belgium
1975 in track cycling